Alfred Silginer (born 18 October 1959) is an Italian luger. He competed in the men's doubles event at the 1980 Winter Olympics.

References

1959 births
Living people
Italian male lugers
Olympic lugers of Italy
Lugers at the 1980 Winter Olympics
Place of birth missing (living people)